Pocahontas is a former coal mining community in Improvement District No. 12 (Jasper National Park) within Alberta's Rockies.

Named after Pocahontas, Virginia, also a coal mining town, which itself in turn was named after  Pocahontas the person.

Currently on the area of the former community is a campground, a hotel, and a trail through the last remaining structures of the former community. Pocahontas campground is operated by Parks Canada, reservable online.

See also 
List of communities in Alberta

References

Jasper National Park